The Walter Minor is a family of four- and six-cylinder inverted inline air-cooled engines, developed under auspices of ing. Šimůnek and used on light aircraft.

After Walter concentrated on the turbine powerplants only, the production of piston engines has been transferred to the Avia company that further developed the family, bringing fuel injection, as the Avia M-137 and M-337. Nowadays the smallest of the family, the four-cylinder carburetted Minor, is produced by a small company in the Czech Republic, while the M337 was available from the LOM Prague.

Variants

4 Cylinder
Minor 4-I
Minor 4-II
Minor 4-III 
Minor 4-IIIS A 4-III fitted with a crankshaft driven supercharger.
Minor M 332 (4 cyl.)

6 Cylinder
Minor 6-I
Minor 6-II
Minor 6-III
Minor 6-IIIS A 6-III fitted with a crankshaft driven supercharger.
Minor M 337 (6 cyl.)

Others
Minor Sc.

Applications

Specifications (Minor 4-cylinder)

Data from: Oldengine.org

See also

References

 Gunston, Bill. World Encyclopedia of Aero Engines. Cambridge, England. Patrick Stephens Limited, 1989. 
Oldengine.org

External links

Aircraft air-cooled inline piston engines
1920s aircraft piston engines
Inverted aircraft piston engines
Minor